The 1952 County Championship was the 53rd officially organised running of the County Championship. Surrey won the Championship title.

Table
12 points for a win
6 points to each side in a match in which scores finish level
4 points for first innings lead in a lost or drawn match
2 points for tie on first innings in a lost or drawn match

Warwickshire and Lancashire records include eight points for a tied match with first innings lead; Sussex and Essex records include four points for tied match without first innings lead. Glamorgan and Worcestershire records include two points each for tie on first innings in drawn match.

References

1952 in English cricket
County Championship seasons